Odebrecht Energia is a Brazilian power company founded in 2010 by the Brazilian multinational Odebrecht.

References

Further reading
 https://www.bloomberg.com/news/articles/2015-04-27/odebrecht-seeks-renewable-energy-partners-as-brazil-funds-dry-up
 http://oglobo.globo.com/economia/negocios/santo-antonio-deve-atrair-duas-chinesas-brookfield-20032846
 https://books.google.com/books?id=ebDZDAAAQBAJ

External links

 
 Odebrecht Energia on Bloomberg

Electric power companies of Brazil
Odebrecht
Companies based in Rio de Janeiro (city)
Brazilian companies established in 2010
Energy companies established in 2010